Kogon may refer to:

 Kogon (surname)
 Kogon, Uzbekistan, a city in the Bukhara region
 Emperor Kōgon (1313–1364), the 1st of Ashikaga Pretenders during the Period of the Northern and Southern Courts in Japan
 Emperor Go-Kōgon (1336–1374), the 4th of the Ashikaga Pretenders during the Period of the Northern and Southern Courts.

See also 
 Kohon
 Kogan